Lipara lucens is a species of frit fly in the family Chloropidae. It is found in Europe.

References

Oscinellinae
Insects described in 1830
Articles created by Qbugbot